The  is a home video game console developed and released by Nintendo in Japan on September 14, 2001, in North America on November 18, 2001, and in PAL territories in 2002. It is the successor to the Nintendo 64 (1996), and predecessor of the Wii (2006). In the sixth generation of video game consoles, the GameCube competed with Sony's PlayStation 2 and Microsoft's Xbox. Flagship games include Super Smash Bros. Melee, Luigi's Mansion, Super Mario Sunshine, Metroid Prime, Mario Kart: Double Dash, Pikmin, Pikmin 2, The Legend of Zelda: The Wind Waker, Chibi-Robo!, and the original Animal Crossing.

Development was enabled by the 1997 formation of computer graphics company ArtX, of former SGI employees who had created the Nintendo 64, and which was later acquired by ATI to produce the GameCube's GPU. In May 1999, Nintendo announced codename Dolphin, released in 2001 as the GameCube. It is Nintendo's first console to use optical discs instead of ROM cartridges, supplemented by writable memory cards for saved games. Unlike its competitors, it is solely focused on gaming and does not play mass media like DVD or CD. The console supports limited online gaming for a few games via a GameCube broadband or modem adapter and can connect to a Game Boy Advance with a link cable for exclusive in-game features using the handheld as a second screen and controller. The GameCube supports e-Reader cards to unlock special features in a few games. The Game Boy Player add-on runs Game Boy, Game Boy Color, and Game Boy Advance cartridge games.

Reception of the GameCube was mixed. It was praised for its controller and extensive library of high-quality games, but was criticized for its exterior design and lack of multimedia features. Nintendo sold  GameCube units worldwide, much fewer than anticipated, and discontinued it in 2007. It was succeeded by the Wii; the first model launched in November 2006 with full backward compatibility with GameCube games and accessories.

History

Background 
In 1997, a graphics hardware design company called ArtX was launched with twenty engineers who had previously worked at SGI. ArtX was led by Wei Yen, who had been SGI's head of Nintendo Operations and of Project Reality, which from 1993 to 1996 had scaled down SGI's supercomputer design to become the Nintendo 64.

Development 
Partnering with Nintendo in May 1998, ArtX began the complete design of the system logic and graphics processor (codenamed Flipper) of Nintendo's sixth-generation video game console. The console's succession of codenames was N2000, Star Cube, and Nintendo Advance. On May 12, 1999, the console was first publicly announced at Nintendo's press conference with the codename Dolphin, as the successor to the Nintendo 64. This included strategic alliances with IBM to create Dolphin's PowerPC-based CPU, codenamed Gekko, and with Panasonic (Matsushita) to create its DVD drive and its own Dolphin-based devices. Nintendo then began providing development kits to game developers such as Rare and Retro Studios.

In April 2000, ArtX was acquired by ATI, whereupon the Flipper graphics processor design had already been mostly completed by ArtX and was not overtly influenced by ATI. In total, ArtX cofounder Greg Buchner recalled that their portion of the console's hardware design timeline had arced from inception in 1998 to completion in 2000. Of the ArtX acquisition, an ATI spokesperson said, "ATI now becomes a major supplier to the game console market via Nintendo. The Dolphin platform is reputed to be king of the hill in terms of graphics and video performance with 128-bit architecture."

The console was announced as the GameCube at a press conference in Japan on August 25, 2000, abbreviated as both "NGC" and "GC" in Japan and "GCN" in Europe and North America. Nintendo unveiled its software lineup for the sixth-generation console at E3 2001, focusing on fifteen launch games, including Luigi's Mansion and Star Wars Rogue Squadron II: Rogue Leader. Several games originally scheduled to launch with the console were delayed. It is also the first Nintendo home console since the Famicom not to have a Mario launch game.

Long before the console's launch, Nintendo had developed and patented an early prototype of motion controls for the GameCube, with which developer Factor 5 had experimented for its launch games. Greg Thomas, Sega of America's VP of Development said, "What does worry me is Dolphin's sensory controllers [which are rumored to include microphones and headphone jacks] because there's an example of someone thinking about something different." These motion control concepts would not be deployed to consumers for several years, until the Wii Remote.

Prior to the GameCube's release, Nintendo focused resources on the launch of the Game Boy Advance, a handheld game console and successor to the original Game Boy and Game Boy Color. As a result, several games originally destined for the Nintendo 64 console were postponed to become early releases on the GameCube. The last first-party game in 2001 for the Nintendo 64 was released in May, one month before the Game Boy Advance's launch and six months before the GameCube's, due to the company's shift in resources. Concurrently, Nintendo was developing GameCube software provisioning future connectivity with the Game Boy Advance. Certain games, such as The Legend of Zelda: Four Swords Adventures and Final Fantasy Crystal Chronicles, can use the handheld as a secondary screen and controller when connected to the console via a link cable.

Nintendo began its marketing campaign with the catchphrase "The Nintendo Difference" at its E3 2001 reveal. The goal was to distinguish itself from the competition as an entertainment company. Later advertisements have the slogan, "Born to Play", and game ads feature a rotating cube animation that morphs into a GameCube logo and end with a voice whispering, "GameCube". Nintendo spent $76 million marketing the GameCube.

In September 2020, leaked documents included Nintendo's plans for a GameCube model that would be both portable with a built-in display and dockable to a TV, similar to its later console the Nintendo Switch. Other leaks suggest plans for a GameCube successor, codenamed Tako, with HD graphics and slots for SD and memory cards, apparently resulting from a partnership with ATI (now AMD) and scheduled for release in 2005.

Release 
The GameCube was launched in Japan on September 14, 2001. Approximately 500,000 units were shipped in time to retailers. The console was scheduled to launch two months later in North America on November 5, 2001, but the date was pushed back in an effort to increase the number of available units. The console eventually launched in North America on November 18, 2001, with over 700,000 units shipped to the region. Other regions followed suit the following year beginning with Europe in the second quarter of 2002.

On April 22, 2002, veteran third-party Nintendo console developer Factor 5 announced its 3D audio software development kit titled MusyX. In collaboration with Dolby Laboratories, MusyX provides motion-based surround sound encoded as Dolby Pro Logic II.

The Triforce arcade board is a joint development between Nintendo, Namco, and Sega, based on the GameCube's design. Its games include Mario Kart Arcade GP and F-Zero AX.

Discontinuation 
Nintendo launched the Wii, the home console successor to the GameCube, on November 19, 2006, in North America and in December 2006 in other regions. In February 2007, Nintendo announced that it had ceased first-party support for the GameCube and that the console had been discontinued, as it was shifting its manufacturing and development efforts towards the Wii and Nintendo DS. GameCube controllers, game discs, and certain accessories continued to be supported via the Wii's backward compatibility, although this feature was removed in later iterations of the Wii console. The final game officially released on the GameCube was Madden NFL 08, on August 14th, 2007. Several games originally developed for the GameCube were either reworked for a Wii release, such as Super Paper Mario, or released on both consoles, such as the Wii launch game The Legend of Zelda: Twilight Princess.

GameCube controllers continued to be supported via backward compatibility on Nintendo's next consoles, the Wii U, and Nintendo Switch, with the GameCube controller adapter in 2014's Super Smash Bros. for Wii U and 2018's Super Smash Bros. Ultimate.

Hardware 

Howard Cheng, technical director of Nintendo technology development, said the company's goal was to select a "simple RISC architecture" to help speed the development of games by making it easier on software developers. IGN reported that the system was "designed from the get-go to attract third-party developers by offering more power at a cheaper price. Nintendo's design document for the console specifies that cost is of utmost importance, followed by space." Hardware partner ArtX's Vice President Greg Buchner stated that their guiding thought on the console's hardware design was to target the developers rather than the players, and to "look into a crystal ball" and discern "what's going to allow the Miyamoto-sans of the world to develop the best games".

Initiating the GameCube's design in 1998, Nintendo partnered with ArtX (then acquired by ATI Technologies during development) for the system logic and the GPU, and with IBM for the CPU. IBM designed a PowerPC-based processor with custom architectural extensions for the next-generation console, known as Gekko, which runs at 486 MHz and features a floating point unit (FPU) capable of a total throughput of 1.9 GFLOPS and a peak of 10.5 GFLOPS. Described as "an extension of the IBM PowerPC architecture", the Gekko CPU is based on the PowerPC 750CXe with IBM's 0.18μm CMOS technology, which features copper interconnects. Codenamed Flipper, the GPU runs at 162 MHz, and in addition to graphics manages other tasks through its audio and input/output (I/O) processors.

The GameCube is Nintendo's first console to not use primarily cartridge media, following the Famicom Data Recorder, Famicom Disk System, SNES-CD, and 64DD which represent past explorations of complementary storage technologies. The GameCube introduced a proprietary miniDVD optical disc format for up to 1.5 GB of data. It was designed by Matsushita Electric Industrial (now Panasonic Corporation) with a proprietary copy-protection scheme unlike the Content Scramble System (CSS) in standard DVDs. The size is sufficient for most games, although a few multi-platform games require an extra disc, higher video compression, or removal of content. By comparison, the PlayStation 2 and Xbox use CDs and DVDs up to 8.5 GB.

Like its predecessor, the Nintendo 64, GameCube models were produced in several different color motifs. The system launched in "Indigo", the primary color shown in advertising and on the logo, and in "Jet Black". One year later, Nintendo released a "Platinum" limited-edition GameCube, which uses a silver color scheme for both the console and controller. A "Spice" orange-colored console was eventually released only in Japan, though  that scheme is only on controllers released in other countries.

Nintendo developed stereoscopic 3D technology for the GameCube, supported by one launch game, Luigi's Mansion. However, the feature never reached production. 3D televisions were not widespread, and it was deemed that compatible displays and crystals for the add-on accessories would be too cost-prohibitive for the consumer. Two audio Easter eggs can be invoked when the power is activated with the "Z" button on the Player 1 controller held down, or with four controllers connected and holding down the "Z" buttons.

Storage 

The GameCube features two memory card ports for saving game data. Nintendo released three memory card options: Memory Card 59 in gray (512 KB), Memory Card 251 in black (2 MB), and Memory Card 1019 in white (8 MB). These are often advertised in megabits instead: 4 Mb, 16 Mb, and 64 Mb, respectively. Memory cards with larger capacities were released by third-party manufacturers.

Controller 

Nintendo learned from its experiences—both positive and negative—with the Nintendo 64's three-handled controller design and chose a two-handled, "handlebar" design for the GameCube. The shape was popularized by Sony's PlayStation controller released in 1994 and its follow-up DualShock series in 1997 with vibration feedback and two analog sticks to improve the 3D experience. Nintendo and Microsoft designed similar features in the controllers for their sixth-generation consoles, but instead of having the analog sticks in parallel, they are staggered by swapping the positions of the directional pad (d-pad) and left analog stick. The GameCube controller features a total of eight buttons, two analog sticks, a d-pad, and a rumble motor. The primary analog stick is on the left with the d-pad located below and closer to the center. On the right are four buttons: a large, green "A" button in the center, a smaller red "B" button to the left, an "X" button to the right, and a "Y" button at the top. Below and to the inside is a yellow "C" analog stick, which often serves a variety of in-game functions, such as controlling the camera angle. The Start/Pause button is located in the middle, and the rumble motor is encased within the center of the controller.

On the top are two "pressure-sensitive" trigger buttons marked "L" and "R". Each essentially provides two functions: one analog and one digital. As the trigger is depressed, it emits an increasing analog signal. Once fully depressed, the trigger "clicks" with a digital signal that a game can use for a separate function. There is also a purple, digital button on the right side marked "Z".

The A button has a uniquely prominent size and placement, having been the primary action button in past Nintendo controller designs. The rubberized analog stick, within the overall button orientation, addresses "Nintendo thumb" pain.

In 2002, Nintendo introduced the WaveBird Wireless Controller, the first wireless gamepad developed by a first-party console manufacturer. The RF-based wireless controller is similar in design to the standard controller. It communicates with the GameCube with a wireless receiver dongle. Powered by two AA batteries, it lacks vibration.

Compatibility 

The GameCube uses GameCube Game Discs, and the Game Boy Player accessory runs Game Pak cartridges for the Game Boy, Game Boy Color, and Game Boy Advance. The GameCube's successor, the Wii, supports backward compatibility with GameCube controllers, memory cards, and games but not the Game Boy Player or other hardware attachments. However, later revisions of the Wii—including the "Family Edition" released in 2011 and the Wii Mini released in 2012—do not support any GameCube hardware or software.

Panasonic Q 

The  is a hybrid version of the GameCube with a standard DVD player, developed by Panasonic in a strategic alliance with Nintendo to develop the optical drive for the original GameCube hardware. Its stainless steel case is completely revised with a DVD-sized front-loading tray, a backlit LCD screen with playback controls, and a carrying handle like the GameCube. Announced by Panasonic on October 19, 2001, it was released exclusively in Japan on December 14 at a suggested retail price of ¥39,800; however, low sales resulted in Panasonic announcing the discontinuation of the Q on December 18, 2003. The Q supports CDs, DVDs, and GameCube discs but there is virtually no integration between the GameCube and DVD player modes.

Software 
The GameCube is Nintendo's first home console with a system menu, activated by powering on without a valid game disc or by holding down the A button while one is loaded.

Games 

In its lifespan from 2001 to 2007, Nintendo licensed over 600 GameCube games. Nintendo bolstered the console's popularity by creating new franchises, such as Pikmin and Animal Crossing, and renewing some that had skipped the Nintendo 64, such as with Metroid Prime. Longer standing franchises include the critically acclaimed The Legend of Zelda: The Wind Waker and Super Mario Sunshine, and the GameCube's best-selling game, Super Smash Bros. Melee, at 7 million copies worldwide. Other Nintendo games are successors to Nintendo 64 games, such as F-Zero GX; Mario Golf: Toadstool Tour; Mario Kart: Double Dash; Mario Party 4, 5, 6, and 7; Mario Power Tennis; and Paper Mario: The Thousand-Year Door. Though committed to its software library, Nintendo was still criticized for not releasing enough launch window games and by the release of Luigi's Mansion instead of a 3D Mario game.

Nintendo had struggled with its family-friendly image during the late 1990s and most of the 2000s. However, during this period, it released more video games for a mature audience with mostly successful results. While the video game industry was focusing on more mature audiences and online connections, Nintendo regained older players who had gravitated to the PlayStation 2 and Xbox during the early 2000s. Some games aimed at older audiences were critically and financially successfulmore than on Dreamcast, and less than on PlayStation 2 and Xbox. Such examples include The Legend of Zelda: Twilight Princess, Super Smash Bros. Melee, Resident Evil 4, Metal Gear Solid: The Twin Snakes, Killer7, Star Wars Rogue Squadron II: Rogue Leader, Final Fantasy Crystal Chronicles, Resident Evil (2002), Metroid Prime, Metroid Prime II: Echoes, Soul Calibur II, Resident Evil Zero, F-Zero GX, Star Fox Adventures, and Star Fox Assault. One of the most well-known GameCube games for mature audiences is Eternal Darkness: Sanity’s Requiem, which underperformed financially, but garnered critical acclaim and is now regarded as a cult classic.

Third-party support 
Early in Nintendo's history, the company had achieved considerable success with third-party developer support on the Nintendo Entertainment System and Super NES. Competition from the Sega Genesis and Sony PlayStation in the 1990s changed the market's landscape and reduced Nintendo's ability to obtain exclusive, third-party support on the Nintendo 64. The Nintendo 64 Game Pak cartridge format increased the cost to manufacture software, as opposed to the cheaper, higher-capacity optical discs on PlayStation.

With the GameCube, Nintendo intended to reverse the trend as evidenced by the number of third-party games available at launch. The new optical disc format increased game storage capacity significantly and reduced production costs. Successful exclusives include Star Wars Rogue Squadron II: Rogue Leader from Factor 5, Resident Evil 4 from Capcom, and Metal Gear Solid: The Twin Snakes from Konami. Sega discontinued its Dreamcast console to become a third-party developer, porting Dreamcast games such as Crazy Taxi and Sonic Adventure 2, and developing new franchises, such as Super Monkey Ball. Longtime Nintendo partner Rare, which had developed GoldenEye 007, Perfect Dark, Banjo-Kazooie, Conker's Bad Fur Day, and the Donkey Kong Country series, released Star Fox Adventures for GameCube, its final Nintendo game before acquisition by Microsoft in 2002. Several third-party developers were contracted to work on new games for Nintendo franchises, including Star Fox: Assault (which became a Player's Choice re-release), Donkey Konga by Namco, and Wario World from Treasure.

Third-party GameCube support was some of the most extensive of any Nintendo console predating the Wii. Some third-party developers, such as Midway, Namco, Activision, Konami, Ubisoft, THQ, Disney Interactive Studios, Humongous Entertainment, EA and EA Sports, continued to release GameCube games into 2007. One of the biggest third-party GameCube developers was Sega, which had quit the console hardware market to become a third-party game developer after the failure of the Dreamcast. It partnered with long-time rival Nintendo, and with Microsoft and Sony, to recuperate profits lost from the Dreamcast. Sega was a successful third-party developer since the early 2000s, mostly those for the family market, such as Super Monkey Ball, Phantasy Star Online, Sonic Adventure, Sonic Adventure 2: Battle, and Sonic Heroes.

Online gaming 

Nintendo's GameCube did not put heavy focus on online games earlier in the console's life. Only eight GameCube games support network connectivity, five with Internet support and three with local area network (LAN) support. The only Internet capable games released in western territories are three role-playing games (RPGs) in Sega's Phantasy Star series: Phantasy Star Online Episode I & II, Phantasy Star Online Episode I & II Plus, and Phantasy Star Online Episode III: C.A.R.D. Revolution. The official servers were decommissioned in 2007, but players can still connect to fan maintained private servers. Japan received two additional games with Internet capabilities, a cooperative RPG, Homeland and a baseball game with downloadable content, Jikkyō Powerful Pro Yakyū 10. Lastly, three racing games have LAN multiplayer modes: 1080° Avalanche, Kirby Air Ride, and Mario Kart: Double Dash. Those can be forced over the Internet with third-party PC software capable of tunneling the GameCube's network traffic.

Online play requires an official broadband or modem adapter because the GameCube lacks out of the box network capabilities. Nintendo never commissioned any Internet services for GameCube, but allowed other publishers to manage custom online experiences.

Reception 
The GameCube received mixed reviews following its launch. PC Magazine praised the overall hardware design and quality of games available at launch. CNET gave an average review rating, noting that though the console lacks a few features offered by its competition, it is relatively inexpensive, has a great controller design, and launched a decent lineup of games. In later reviews, criticism mounted against the console often centering on its overall look and feel, describing it as "toy-ish". With poor sales figures and the associated financial harm to Nintendo, a Time International article called the GameCube an "unmitigated disaster".

Retrospectively, Joystiq compared the GameCube's launch window to its successor, the Wii, noting that the GameCube's "lack of games" resulted in a subpar launch, and the console's limited selection of online games damaged its market share in the long run. Time International concluded that the system had low sales figures, because it lacked "technical innovations".

Sales 
In Japan, between 280,000 and 300,000 GameCube consoles were sold during the first three days of its sale, out of an initial shipment of 450,000 units. During its launch weekend, $100 million worth of GameCube products were sold in North America. The console was sold out in several stores, faster than initial sales of both of its competitors, the Xbox and the PlayStation 2. Nintendo reported that the most popular launch game is Luigi's Mansion, with more sales at its launch than Super Mario 64 had. Other popular games include Star Wars Rogue Squadron II: Rogue Leader and Wave Race: Blue Storm. By early December 2001, 600,000 units had been sold in the US.

Nintendo predicted 50 million GameCube units by 2005, but only sold 22 million GameCube units worldwide during its lifespan, placing it slightly behind the Xbox's 24 million, though it did manage to outsell the Xbox in Japan, and well behind the PlayStation 2's 155 million. Its sales exceeded that of the Xbox 360 in Japan. The GameCube's predecessor, the Nintendo 64, also outperformed it at nearly 33 million units. It also exceeded the short-lived Dreamcast, which yielded 9.13 million units. In September 2009, IGN ranked the GameCube 16th in its list of best gaming consoles of all time, placing it behind all three of its sixth-generation competitors: the PlayStation 2 (3rd), the Dreamcast (8th), and the Xbox (11th). As of March 31, 2003, 9.55 million GameCube units had been sold worldwide, behind Nintendo's initial goal of 10 million consoles. Two Ars Technica articles from 2006 showed that Nintendo had officially sold 24 million GameCube consoles worldwide.
Many of Nintendo's own first-party games, such as Super Smash Bros. Melee, Pokémon Colosseum, and Mario Kart: Double Dash, had strong sales, though this did not typically benefit third-party developers or directly drive sales of their games. However, at the same time, these first-party games, and second-party and third-party games, elevated the GameCube.

Sales of many cross-platform games—such as sports franchises released by Electronic Arts—were far below their PlayStation 2 and Xbox counterparts, eventually prompting some developers to scale back or completely cease support for the GameCube. Exceptions include Sega's family friendly Sonic Adventure 2 and Super Monkey Ball, which reportedly yielded more sales on GameCube than most of the company's games on the PlayStation 2 and Xbox. In June 2003, Acclaim Entertainment CEO Rod Cousens said that the company would no longer support the GameCube, and criticized it as a system "that don't deliver profits". Acclaim would later rescind his claims, by saying the company would elevate support for the system. This decision was made unclear after the company filed for bankruptcy in August 2004. In September 2003, Eidos Interactive announced to end support for the GameCube, as the publisher was losing money from developing for Nintendo's console. This led to several games in development being canceled for the system. Eidos's CEO Mike McGravey would say that the GameCube was a "declining business". However, after the company's purchase by the SCi Entertainment Group in 2005, Eidos resumed development for the system and released Lego Star Wars: The Video Game and Tomb Raider: Legend. Several third-party games originally intended to be GameCube exclusives—most notably Capcom's Viewtiful Joe and Resident Evil 4—were eventually ported to other systems in an attempt to maximize profits following lackluster sales of the original GameCube versions.

In March 2003, now-defunct UK retailer Dixons removed all GameCube consoles, accessories and games from its stores. That same month, another UK retailer Argos, cut the price of the GameCube in their stores to £78.99, which was more than £50 cheaper than Nintendo's SRP for the console at the time. However, in October of that year, they did eventually re-stock their supply of consoles after a price drop was ordered which caused the console sales to outpace the PlayStation 2 for a week.

With sales sagging and millions of unsold consoles in stock, Nintendo halted GameCube production for the first nine months of 2003 to reduce surplus units. Sales rebounded slightly after a price drop to US$99.99 on September 24, 2003 and the release of The Legend of Zelda: Collector's Edition bundle. A demo disc, the GameCube Preview Disc, was also released in a bundle in 2003. Beginning with this period, GameCube sales continued to be steady, particularly in Japan, but the GameCube remained in third place in worldwide sales during the sixth-generation era because of weaker sales performance elsewhere, though its fortunes would change for the better in America and Europe.

Iwata forecasted to investors that the company would sell 50 million GameCube units worldwide by March 2005, but by the end of 2006, it had only sold 21.74 millionfewer than half. However, it had the highest attach rate of any Nintendo console at 9.59 and was profitable, even more than Xbox with higher sales rates.

Market share 
With the GameCube, Nintendo failed to reclaim the market share lost by its predecessor, the Nintendo 64. Through its generation, GameCube hardware sales remained far behind its direct competitor the PlayStation 2, and slightly behind the Xbox, though there would be times when the GameCube would upstage its rival consoles. The console's family-friendly appeal and lack of support from certain third-party developers skewed the GameCube toward a younger market, which was a minority of the gaming population during the sixth generation. Many third-party games popular with teenagers or adults, such as the blockbuster Grand Theft Auto series and several key first-person shooters, skipped the GameCube entirely in favor of the PlayStation 2 and Xbox. However, many gaming journalists and analysts from the 2000s noted that Nintendo's primary focus on younger audiences, and its family-friendly image, was the biggest advantage and disadvantage at a time when video games were aimed at more mature audiences. Nintendo was successful with games aimed at a more mature audience.

, the GameCube had a 13% market share, tying with the Xbox in sales but far below the 60% of the PlayStation 2. However, with slow sales and tough competition, Nintendo's position improved. The American market share for the GameCube had gone up from 19% to 37% in one year alone due to price cuts and high-quality games. By Christmas of 2003, Nintendo of America's president George Harrison reported that the company's price cuts down to just under $100 quadrupled sales in the American market. GameCube's profitability never reached that of the PlayStation 2 or Game Boy Advance. However, it was more profitable than the Xbox.

GameCube's first two years had slow sales and struggles, and by 2004 and 2005 vastly improved to a 32% share of the hardware market in Europe. Due to price drops, which saved it in the American markets, and high-quality games from various developers, such as Pokémon Colosseum and Resident Evil 4, the GameCube improved to put Xbox down to third place. The top three European countries for GameCube success included the UK, France, and Germany, and modestly in Spain and Italy. Though falling behind the PlayStation 2 in Europe, the GameCube was successful and profitable there.

Legacy 
Many games that debuted on the GameCube, including the Pikmin series, Chibi-Robo!, Metroid Prime, and Luigi's Mansion became popular and profitable Nintendo franchises or subseries.

GameCube controllers have limited support on Wii U and Switch, to play Super Smash Bros. for Wii U, and Super Smash Bros. Ultimate respectively, via a USB adapter.

Regarding concerns about the correlation between violence and video games, a 2009 study by Iowa State University found that certain games like Super Mario Sunshine and Chibi-Robo!, which were GameCube exclusives, would help players learn positive skills about helping others, empathy, and cooperation, as well as the game Super Monkey Ball, which was a GameCube exclusive, could help surgeons perform laparoscopic surgery better than surgeons who don't play video games.

See also 
 Dolphin (emulator)
 GameCube accessories

Notes

References

External links 

 
 

 
2000s toys
Discontinued video game consoles
Home video game consoles
Products introduced in 2001
Products and services discontinued in 2007
GameCube
Sixth-generation video game consoles